Nikolai Mikhailovich Korobov  (November 23 1917 – October 25 2004) was a Soviet mathematician specializing in number theory and numerical analysis. He is best known for his work in analytic number theory, especially in exponential and trigonometric sums.

References

1917 births
2004 deaths
Soviet mathematicians
Russian mathematicians
Number theorists
Moscow State University alumni